Shardul Vihan (born 11 January 2003) is an Indian sport shooter. He won the silver medal at the 2018 Asian Games in Men’s Double Trap at age 15.

References

External links

Living people
Indian male sport shooters
Shooters at the 2018 Asian Games
Medalists at the 2018 Asian Games
Asian Games silver medalists for India
Asian Games medalists in shooting
2003 births
Trap and double trap shooters
Sportspeople from Meerut
21st-century Indian people